The 1936 South Carolina United States Senate election was held on November 2, 1936 to select the U.S. Senator from the state of South Carolina.  Incumbent Democratic Senator James F. Byrnes won the Democratic primary and defeated two Republican candidates in the general election to win another six-year term.

Democratic primary

Candidates
James F. Byrnes, incumbent Senator since 1931
William C. Harllee, Army colonel
Thomas P. Stoney, former Mayor of Charleston

Campaign
Byrnes was criticized for his enthusiastic support of the President Roosevelt's New Deal and both Stoney and Harillee argued that the New Deal's agriculture programs were destroying states' rights in South Carolina and bringing the state into the fold of a federal bureaucracy, but Byrnes responded by stating the New Deal was needed to assist South Carolinians during the economic hardships of the Great Depression and pointed out that agricultural prices had improved because of it.

Results
The attacks on Byrnes would be very ineffective and he went on to win the primary with over 87% of the vote.

General election

Campaign
Since the end of Reconstruction in 1877, the Democratic Party dominated the politics of South Carolina and its statewide candidates were never seriously challenged.  Byrnes did not campaign for the general election as there was no chance of defeat.  The Republicans were split between two factions that wanted to control the spoils system should a Republican victory occur in the Presidential election.  They did not compete against Byrnes, but were rather competing against each other to show the national Republican Party who held more influence in the state.

Results

|-
| bgcolor="#FF3333" |
| Republican 
| Joseph Augustis Tolbert
| align="right" | 961
| align="right" | 0.8
| align="right" | N/A
|-
| bgcolor="#FF3333" |
| Republican 
| Marion W. Seabrook
| align="right" | 702
| align="right" | 0.6
| align="right" | N/A
|-

|-
| 
| colspan=5 |Democratic hold
|-

See also
List of United States senators from South Carolina
United States Senate elections, 1936
United States House of Representatives elections in South Carolina, 1936

References

"Supplemental Report of the Secretary of State to the General Assembly of South Carolina." Reports of State Officers Boards and Committees to the General Assembly of the State of South Carolina. Volume I. Columbia, SC: 1937, p. 6.

South Carolina
1936
1936 South Carolina elections